This is a summary of notable incidents that have taken place at amusement parks, water parks, or theme parks operated by Premier Parks, LLC.  This list is not intended to be a comprehensive list of every such event, but only those that have a significant impact on the parks or park operations, or are otherwise significantly newsworthy.

The term incidents refers to major accidents, injuries, or deaths that occur at a park.  While these incidents were required to be reported to regulatory authorities due to where they occurred, they usually fall into one of the following categories:

 Caused by negligence on the part of the guest.  This can be refusal to follow specific ride safety instructions, or deliberate intent to break park rules.
 The result of a guest's known, or unknown, health issues.
 Negligence on the part of the park, either by ride operator or maintenance.
 Act of God or a generic accident (e.g. slipping and falling), that is not a direct result of an action on anybody's part.

Elitch Gardens

Mind Eraser
On July 11, 1999, a Denver woman brought suit against Premier Parks because of injuries obtained on the Mind Eraser roller coaster. She claims that the coaster resulted in many symptoms, including a bloody eye, slurred speech and memory loss. At least 21 other people also complained of injuries received from the ride.

The Rainbow
 On May 26, 2002, a 28-year-old man with Down syndrome opened his seat restraints and stood while the ride was in motion, subsequently falling to his death. Witnesses reported that the victim unlatched his seat belt and maneuvered himself out of the lap restraints.

Sidewinder
 On August 2, 1997, a 45-year-old ride operator suffered a fatal fall from the three-story roller coaster platform. She was taken to Denver Health Medical Center where she was pronounced dead. OSHA fined the park over $32,000 as a result.

Magic Springs and Crystal Falls

Gauntlet
On August 28, 2005, a maintenance worker got one of his feet stuck in the tracks of the Gauntlet roller coaster. He was freed by a metal cutting saw.

Old No. 2 Logging Co. Log Flume
 On September 4, 2006, an 11-year-old boy was injured when a stray .22 caliber bullet struck him in the wrist.  Police had no suspects in the case.

Twist and Shout
On July 30, 2006, a 45-year-old woman from Memphis, Tennessee fell from the Twist and Shout coaster due to centripetal force. Inspectors said that the victim was too large for the ride, causing the restraints to not work properly. A report by the Arkansas Department of Labor stated that the ride operator should not have let her occupy more than one seat on the ride. The victim sued the park and the ride's importer for US$16 million, claiming that the park failed to seat her properly, and that the ride did not provide adequate safety features.

X-Coaster
On June 9, 2007, a bird or other large animal crossed electrical wires in nearby Hot Springs, Arkansas, causing a 25-minute-long power outage to the park. This caused many of the park's rides to shut down. Those riders were rescued by the local fire department who used a generator to provide enough power to the ride so the vehicle could coast to a lower access point. Riders on other attractions were evacuated by park employees without incident. Nausea was the primary complaint of the rescued X-Coaster riders, although one 37-year-old X-Coaster rider was taken to the hospital complaining of neck pain and a headache. The park has experienced minute power outages in the past with no incidents.
On July 24, 2017, passengers were stuck on the roller coaster for an hour in 95 degree heat. No injuries were reported, although some people on the ride complained because of the humidity.

Rapids Water Park

Big Surf
On April 6, 2013, a 5-year-old boy was unresponsive and nearly drowned while he was playing in the wave pool. He was revived, and was conscious by the time paramedics arrived and was taken to a local hospital. Further information on his recovery was not published.

Wild Waves Theme Park

Activity Pool
On August 20, 2016, a 33-year-old man from India was found unconscious and drowned in the Activity Pool. Paramedics performed CPR on him, but he couldn't be revived and he died due to asphyxia. One of the lifeguards reported to the police and said that some children found a body at the bottom of the pool and believed that they were pranking him. The police later responded and said that the park had everything under control.

Other incidents involving guests
On October 5, 2019, a 17-year-old was injured after being shot in the parking lot outside the park's entrance during its annual Fright Fest event. The victim was taken to Harborview Medical Center and remained in critical condition.

References

CNL Income Properties